The Sullivan Ordinance was a municipal law passed on January 21, 1908, in New York City by the board of aldermen, barring the management of a public place from allowing women to smoke within their venue. The ordinance did not bar women from smoking in general nor did the ordinance bar women from smoking in public, only public places. Right after the ordinance was enacted, on January 22, Katie Mulcahey, the only person cited for breaking this ordinance, was fined $5 for smoking in public and arrested for refusing to pay the fine; however, the ordinance itself did not mention fines nor does it ban women from smoking in public. She was released the next day.  The mayor at the time, George B. McClellan Jr., vetoed the ordinance two weeks later.

References 

History of New York City
Legal history of New York (state)
Tobacco control
Smoking in the United States
1908 in New York City
1908 in law